Jim Griffen is a New Zealand rugby league footballer who represented New Zealand.

Playing career
Griffen played for Auckland in 1909 against Taranaki.

In 1910 he played twice against the touring Great Britain Lions, once for Auckland and once for New Zealand. In 1912 he was part of the Auckland side that defeated New Zealand 38-16 prior to their tour of Australia.

References

New Zealand rugby league players
New Zealand national rugby league team players
Auckland rugby league team players
North Shore Albions players
Rugby league props
Place of birth missing